Sérgio Hingst (1924 – 8 November 2004) was a Brazilian film actor. He appeared in more than 150 films during his career.

Selected filmography
 Lights Out (1953)
 Sob o Céu da Bahia (1956)
 Case of the Naves Brothers (1967)
 A Arte de Amar Bem (1970)
 OSS 117 Takes a Vacation (1970)
 The Palace of Angels (1970)
 The Prophet of Hunger (1970)

References

External links

1924 births
2004 deaths
Brazilian male film actors
Brazilian people of German descent
People from Sorocaba